The Lenkstein is a mountain in the Rieserferner group on the border between Tyrol, Austria, and South Tyrol, Italy.

References 
 Dieter Seibert: Leichte 3000er. Bruckmann Verlag, München 2001, 
 Hanspaul Menara: Südtiroler Gipfelwanderungen; Athesia; Bozen 2001, 

Mountains of the Alps
Mountains of Tyrol (state)
Mountains of South Tyrol
Alpine three-thousanders
Rieserferner Group
Austria–Italy border
International mountains of Europe
Rieserferner-Ahrn Nature Park
Geography of East Tyrol